50 States, 50 Laughs is the name of a 2000 album by alternative comedian Neil Hamburger. It was a limited release by Million Dollar Performances and was sold exclusively during Neil Hamburger's 2000 tour.

Track listing

References

Gregg Turkington albums
2000 albums